Gays River is a rural community of the Halifax Regional Municipality and Colchester County in the Canadian province of Nova Scotia. The community is located along the  River, from which the community derives its name.

References

External links
 Explore HRM

Communities in Halifax, Nova Scotia
General Service Areas in Nova Scotia
Communities in Colchester County
Mining communities in Nova Scotia